Olympique Football Club de Charleville-Mézières is a French football team from the city of Charleville-Mézières, Ardennes, which plays in Division d'honneur (6th division in the French football league system).

History
The team was founded in 1904 as Association Sportive des anciens élèves de Belair la Villette. The club was renamed Club Ardennais in 1910, Football Club de Charleville in 1927 and then Football Club Olympique Charleville (FCO Charleville) in 1932, in a merger with Olympique de Charleville.

The team became professional in 1935, and played in Division 2 till 1939. In 1936, the club obtained its major achievement by qualifying to the Coupe de France final, but lost against RC Paris. The team had a very defensive strategy for the era, thanks to captain Helenio Herrera.

After the World War II, the club did not retrieve its professional status and found it difficult to get to Division 2. The team was professional from 1994 to 1997, but was forced to forsake playing due to financial problems. The team was relegated to the 6th division, and changed its name as Olympique Football Club de Charleville-Mézières.

Honours
Coupe de France runners-up: 1936

Current squad

Managerial history
 Erich Bieber: 1935–1937
 Pepi Lehner: 1938–1939
 Segaux: 1951–1952
 Claude Breny: 1982–1984
 Etienne Martinot: 1986–1988
 Denis Troch: January 1990 – 1991
 Moussa Bezzaz: 1991–1997
 Alex Dupont: 1997 – October 1997
 Miguel Vincent: 2003–2004
 Marc Kopniaeff: 2004–

References

External links
 Official site

 
Charleville
1904 establishments in France
Sport in Ardennes (department)
Football clubs in Grand Est